Margaret of Clermont (1104/05 – 1132) was a countess consort of Flanders twice by marriage to Charles I, Count of Flanders and Thierry, Count of Flanders. She was ruling suo jure countess regnant of Amiens 1118-1132.

Life
Her parents were Renaud II, Count of Clermont-en-Beauvaisis and his first wife, Adelaide, Countess of Vermandois (daughter of Herbert IV, Count of Vermandois).

Margaret was first married to Charles I, Count of Flanders in 1115. As a dowry, she received the county of Amiens. The marriage was brief and childless. 

Later, c. 1128, Margaret married Hugh II, Count of Saint-Pol, they had two sons, Raoul, and Guy. 

Her third husband was Baldwin of Encre. They had one daughter, Elisabeth (died after 1189) who later married Gautier III, Lord of Heilly.

Her fourth and final husband was Thierry, Count of Flanders. They had one daughter, Laurette of Flanders who, like her mother, had four husbands (Iwain, Count of Aalst, Henry II, Duke of Limburg; Raoul I of Vermandois, and Henry IV of Luxembourg. Laurette later retired to a nunnery where she died in 1170.

References

Sources

Countesses of Flanders
12th-century women from the county of Flanders
1100s births
12th-century deaths
12th-century women rulers